Walter Gordon (13 August 1893 – 24 December 1939) was a German theoretical physicist.

Life
Walter Gordon was the son of businessman Arnold Gordon and his wife Bianca Gordon (nee Brann). The family moved to Switzerland in his early years. In 1900 he attended school in St. Gallen and in 1915 he began his studies of mathematics and physics at University of Berlin. He received his doctoral degree in 1921 from Max Planck. In 1922, while still at the University of Berlin, Gordon became the assistant of Max von Laue. In 1925, he worked for some months in Manchester with William Lawrence Bragg and later, at the Kaiser Wilhelm Society for fiber chemistry in Berlin. In 1926, he moved to Hamburg, where he attained the habilitation in 1929. In 1930 he became a professor. He married a local Hamburg woman, Gertrud Lobbenberg, in 1932. He moved to Stockholm in 1933 because of the political situation in Germany. While at the university he worked on mechanics and mathematical physics.

Notable works
Oskar Klein and Walter Gordon proposed the Klein–Gordon equation to describe quantum particles in the framework of relativity. Another important contribution by Gordon was to the theory of the Dirac equation, where he introduced the Gordon decomposition of the current into its center of mass and spin contributions, and so helped explain the  g-factor value in  the electron's gyromagnetic ratio.

References

Further reading
 Poggendorff, J. C. (Ed.): J. C. Poggendorffs biographisch-literarisches Handwörterbuch. Bd. VI (1923–1931). Berlin: Verlag Chemie GmbH, 1936
 Bebus, Allen G.: World Who's Who in Science. Hanibal, Missouri: Western Publishing Company, 1968
 Ullmann, Dieter: "Ein Bild des Quantenphysikers Walter Gordon". Apoldaer Heimat 14(1996) 39

1893 births
1939 deaths
20th-century German physicists
Stockholm University alumni
Jewish emigrants from Nazi Germany to Sweden
Theoretical physicists
People from Apolda
Jewish physicists